David Charles Brooke-Taylor (15 June 1920 – 17 July 2000)  was an English cricketer who played first-class cricket for Derbyshire from 1947 to 1949.

Brooke-Taylor was born at Bakewell, Derbyshire. He was educated at Cheltenham College. He started playing for Derbyshire in the second XI and for the Club and Ground in 1938, and continued doing so in 1939. After the war he played similar games but made his first-class debut for Derbyshire against Nottinghamshire in July 1947 as captain. He was standing in for Edward Gothard according to the Derbyshire tradition that the captain be an amateur. He scored 1 in the first innings and 38 in the second. He played two more first-class matches that season, captaining one of them against Surrey and making his top score of 61 not out against Northamptonshire. In 1948 he played regularly in the County squad and in miscellaneous matches. In 1949 he played for the second XI in the Minor Counties Championship and in  two final first-class matches in August 1949. 
 
Brooke Taylor was a right-hand batsman and played 26 innings in 15 first-class matches at an average of 15.00 with a top score of 61 not out.

Brooke-Taylor died at Tremadoc, Gwynedd at the age of 80. His uncle Geoffrey Brooke-Taylor had also played for Derbyshire.

References

1920 births
2000 deaths
Derbyshire cricketers
English cricketers
People educated at Cheltenham College
Sportspeople from Gloucestershire